Gérard Leseul (born 15 August 1960) is a French politician who has been Member of Parliament for Seine-Maritime's 5th constituency since winning the 2020 by-election.

Political career
In parliament, Leseul serves on the Committee on Sustainable Development and Regional Planning and the Parliamentary Office for the Evaluation of Scientific and Technological Choices (OPECST).

References

Living people
1960 births
Socialist Party (France) politicians
Deputies of the 15th National Assembly of the French Fifth Republic
21st-century French politicians

People from Seine-Maritime